Avenue Hospital was a health facility in Westgate, Bridlington, East Riding of Yorkshire, England. The remaining structure is a Grade II* listed building.

History
The hospital was established in an early 18th century town house in 1932. It joined the National Health Service in 1948. After services transferred to modern facilities at Bridlington Hospital in 1988, the Avenue Hospital closed and, after standing derelict for a few years, the building was converted into apartments in 1993.

References

Hospitals established in 1932
1932 establishments in England
Hospitals in the East Riding of Yorkshire
Defunct hospitals in England
Bridlington